Five (stylized as 5ive) is the self titled debut studio album by English boy band Five. It was released in the United Kingdom on 22 June 1998 and charted at number one the UK Albums Chart, becoming the band's only album to do so. The album was later released in the United States on 14 July 1998, where it charted at number 27 on the Billboard 200, making it the most successful album by the band in the region.

Largely produced by Jake Schulze and Denniz Pop – the latter who also served as the executive producer with Simon Cowell – the album spawned six singles, of which all but one reached the top 10 of the UK Singles Chart, the exception – "It's the Things You Do" – having only been released in the United States. On 4 December 1998, the British Phonographic Industry awarded the album a Platinum certification, an accolade later matched by the Recording Industry Association of America. The album has since gone on to earn double platinum status in the UK and sold in excess of 4 million copies worldwide.

Singles
The first single, "Slam Dunk (Da Funk)", was released on 1 December 1997, and peaked at number 10 on the UK Singles Chart. It was also chosen as the new NBA theme song after its release in the United States. The second single, "When the Lights Go Out", was released on 2 March 1998. It peaked at No. 4 in the UK, and also made it to number two in Australia, number seven in Sweden, number ten in the United States and number eleven in Ireland. The third single, "Got the Feelin'", was released on 8 June 1998 and peaked at No. 3 in the UK, number two in New Zealand, number twelve in Sweden, number six in Austria and number four in Ireland and the Netherlands.

The fourth single, "Everybody Get Up", was released on 21 August 1998. It was the album's most successful single, debuting at number one in New Zealand, which gave Five their first ever number-one. The song also made it to number two in the UK, becoming Five's highest-charting song in the UK at the time. Other chart positions included number four in Germany, number nine in the Netherlands and number five in Austria and Sweden. The fifth single, "It's the Things You Do", was released in the United States only, on 27 October 1998. It was unsuccessful, only making it to number 53. The sixth and final single, "Until the Time Is Through", was released on 16 November 1998. It became Five's second UK number-two single, while also making it to number three in Ireland, number eight in Germany, number eleven in Sweden, number 14 in New Zealand and number 15 in the Netherlands.

Track listing

Notes
 signifies a remixer
 signifies an additional producer
"Slam Dunk Da Funk" contains a sample from "Clap Your Hands", performed by Herbie.
"Everybody Get Up" contains a sample from "I Love Rock 'n' Roll", performed by Joan Jett & The Black Hearts.
"Switch" contains a sample from "Every Guy", performed by Take That.

Credits and personnel
Note: Track numbers are according to the international edition of the album.

Main producers
Simon Cowell – executive production
Denniz Pop – executive production; production on tracks 1, 3, 9, 12, 15, 16 and 55
Jake – production on tracks 1, 3, 5, 9, 13, 15, 16 and 55
Additional producers
Max Martin – production on tracks 1, 5, 7 and 12
Eliot Kennedy – production on tracks 3 and 11; mixing on track 3
Tim Lever – production on tracks 3 and 11; mixing on track 3; remix on track 5
Mike Percy – production on tracks 3 and 11; mixing on track 3; remix on track 5
Richard Stannard – production on tracks 4 and 6
Julian Gallagher – production on tracks 4 and 6
Kristian Lundin – production on track 7
Steve Mac – production and mixing on track 8
Cutfather & Joe – production and mixing on track 10
TTW (Topham Twigg and Paul Waterman) – production on track 14

Additional production personnel
Matt Sime – recording and mixing on tracks 4 and 6
Tim Laws – additional production and additional mixing on track 8
Chris Laws – engineering on track 8
Robin Sellars – mix engineering on track 8; remix engineering on track 11
Dave Walters – additional engineering on track 8
Andy Kowalski – additional mix engineering on track 8
Fred Defaye – engineering on track 9
Joe Belmaati – recording on track 10
Mads Nilsson – mixing on track 10
Nigel Wright – remix on track 11
Chris McDonnell – engineering on track 14
Paul Waterman – mixing on track 14

Charts

Weekly charts

Year-end charts

Certifications and sales

Release history

References

1998 debut albums
Five (band) albums
Albums produced by Cutfather
Albums produced by Max Martin
Albums produced by Richard Stannard (songwriter)
Albums recorded at Cheiron Studios